Kibdelosporangium is a Gram-positive genus from the family of Pseudonocardiaceae. Kibdelosporangium bacteria produce substances with antibacterial, anticancer, and antiviral activities.

References

Further reading
 
 
 

Pseudonocardiales
Bacteria genera